Ana Moreira (born 13 February 1980) is a Portuguese actress. She has appeared in more than 20 films since 1997. She starred in The Mutants, which was screened in the Un Certain Regard section at the 1998 Cannes Film Festival.

Selected filmography
 The Mutants (1998)
 Too Late (2000)
 Água e Sal (2001)
 Rasganço (2001)
 O Fascínio (2003)
 Adriana (2005)
 Pedro e Inês (2005, TV series)
 O Capacete Dourado (2006)
 Transe (2006)
 Histórias de Alice (2007)
 L'Arc-en-Ciel (2009)
 A Corte do Norte (2009)
 La Religieuse portugaise (2009)
 Tabu (2012)

References

External links

1980 births
Living people
Portuguese film actresses
Actresses from Lisbon
Golden Globes (Portugal) winners
20th-century Portuguese actresses
21st-century Portuguese actresses